The Munyati River (also known as the Umniati River, and as the Sanyati River for part of its length) is a river in Zimbabwe. Under the Rhodesian administration, it was officially named the Umniati, but its spelling was changed in 1983 to more closely resemble the correct Shona pronunciation.

It runs approximately north-west and for much of its length it originally formed the southern border of Mashonaland province, and today is largely the southern border of Mashonaland West. The river is joined by the Mupfure River (also known as the Umfuli). Below this point, the river is often referred to as the Sanyati. After a total of  the river flows into Lake Kariba (the section of the Zambezi between the Kariba Dam and the Batoka Gorge), making it part of the Zambezi Basin.

The river flow is highly variable, reflecting the sharp distinction in the local climate between dry and wet seasons.

Gandavaroyi Falls
The biggest drop on the river is at Gandavaroyi Falls (Ganderowe Falls). As in Shona, ganda means "to throw", and varoyi means "witches", "with typical poetry and precision, the Local people have named the cataract after the picturesque practice they had of throwing reputed witches over the waterfall."

See also
 Munyati
 Southern Africa
 Wildlife of Zimbabwe

References

External links
 Map of Zimbabwe from the University of Texas showing the river.

Rivers of Zimbabwe
Lake Kariba
Tributaries of the Zambezi River